Almaz Askarov may refer to:
 Almaz Askarov (footballer) (born 1992), Russian footballer
 Almaz Askarov (wrestler) (born 1973), Kyrgyzstani wrestler